Japan participated in the 2014 Asian Games in Incheon, South Korea from 19 September to 4 October 2014.

Medal summary

Medal table

Medalists

Football

Men's tournament
Group D

Round of 16

Quarterfinals

Women's tournament
Group B

Quarterfinals

Semifinals

Finals

Handball

Men's tournament
Group D

Women's tournament
Group B

References

Nations at the 2014 Asian Games
2014
Asian Games